2008 Valencia GP2 Series round was the Eight round of the 2008 GP2 Series season. It was held on August 23 and 24, 2008 at Valencia Street Circuit at Valencia, Spain. The race was used as a support race to the 2008 European Grand Prix.

Classification

Qualifying

Feature race

Sprint race

References

Valencia
Valencia GP2